Ismet Horo (born 5 July 1959) is a Bosnian comedian. Horo began his professional comedy career in 1986 and has since released 16 comedy albums, three stand-up specials and a comedic book. He regularly appears on Bosnian talk shows and television series.

Early life
Horo was born in 1959, as he jokingly says, "before abortion was legal" and into a mixed marriage of a male father and a female mother. Horo states that his interest in comedy began when he was still in high school.

Bibliography
Ovdje ni lokum nije rahat (2007)

Discography
Al sam isp'o seljak (1995)
Dav'diš tuge bez Juge (1996)
Bosna je bila i biće (1997)
Staću, kad sam taki (1998)
Nove fore Ismet Hore (1999)
Šuti i trpi (2000)
Jedan je Ismet Horo (2000)
Ja samo pjevam (2001)
Naša je sreća u kanti smeća (2001)Horo traži koku (2002)Smijehom protiv bora uz Ismeta Hora (2003)Horo i Pajdo - Iz oćiju nam kradu (2003)Tri majstora smijeha (2004)Stislo sa svih strana (2004)Tjeraju me u Evropu a ja nemam ni za klopu (2005)Dobra vakta k'o obraza nema (2006)Uživo (2006)Al sam isp'o seljak (2007 version)Ovdje ni lokum nije rahat (2007)Daj šta daš (2011)Ne kradi jer će biti konkurencija vladi (2013; plus DVD)
Ako glasate za nas (2014)

VHS and DVD
Ismet Horo - Nove fore - Dvije žene a ja sam (2001)
Trazim djevicu da odmorim ljevicu (2002)
Ja kokuz vehbija bakzuz (2004)

References

1959 births
Living people
Bosniaks of Bosnia and Herzegovina
Bosnia and Herzegovina male actors
Bosnia and Herzegovina comedians